4 Nights at the Palais Royale is a live album released by the Canadian rock band Sloan in 1999.  It was mostly recorded from four live shows performed at the Palais Royale in Toronto, Ontario in 1998, although some of the songs were taken from other concerts on their 1998 Navy Blues tour.  The band and fans alike consider it a fairly accurate representation of a typical Sloan concert, with a mix of old and new songs and plenty of audience participation.

Track listing

Personnel

Sloan 

 Chris Murphy – bass guitar, drums, vocals
 Andrew Scott – drums, guitar, vocals
 Patrick Pentland – guitar, vocals
 Jay Ferguson – guitar, vocals

Additional musicians 

 Ben Gunning – guitar (on "Underwhelmed")

References

Sloan (band) albums
1999 live albums
Murderecords albums